Newlands railway station is a Metrorail station on the Southern Line, serving the suburb of Newlands in Cape Town.

The station is located between the SAB Newlands Brewery and the Newlands Cricket Ground It has two side platforms and two tracks; the station building is at ground level on the western side of the tracks.

Notable places nearby
 Newlands Stadium
 Newlands Cricket Ground
 South African Breweries Newlands Brewery
 Newlands Swimming Pool

Railway stations in Cape Town
Metrorail Western Cape stations